Dowlatabad (also Romanized as Dowlatābād; also known as Daulatābād and Dulatābād) is a village in Karvan-e Olya Rural District, Karvan District, Tiran and Karvan County, Isfahan Province, Iran. At the 2006 census, its population was 1,931, in 500 families.

References 

Populated places in Tiran and Karvan County